Inseparable is the debut studio album by American singer Natalie Cole, released on May 11, 1975, by Capitol Records. The album became her first gold-certified album and spawned the number-one R&B hits "This Will Be (An Everlasting Love)" and "Inseparable". The hit album and its singles earned Cole two Grammy Awards for Best New Artist and Best Female R&B Vocal Performance.
.

History
By 1974, Natalie Cole, the daughter of legendary jazz/pop crooner Nat King Cole, was struggling to get her own music career off the ground. Ever since she had started performing at clubs and festivals, Cole had tried to forge her own path away from the one that several of her father's fans thought she would turn to. Cole refused to record jazz material in fear she would be accused of riding her father's coattails. A longtime fan of soul and blues singers such as Janis Joplin and Aretha Franklin, Cole had instead inspired to follow in their footsteps. After performing at one club, she was spotted by musicians Chuck Jackson (step-brother of Jesse Jackson) and Marvin Yancy, who was shopping songs that had been turned down by Franklin herself. Cole, Yancy and Jackson recorded demos for songs that later led to Cole being signed to her father's label, Capitol Records.

Release and reaction

Released in the spring of 1975, Inseparable shot to the top of the R&B album charts and was also a top twenty hit on the Billboard pop album charts sparked by the album's first single, "This Will Be (An Everlasting Love)". The song's Franklin-inspired production's catchy melodies and hooks helped to make it a number-one hit on the Hot Soul Singles chart while also reaching number six on the Billboard Hot 100. The title track also became a hit reaching number-one on the R&B chart while reaching number thirty-two on the Billboard Hot 100. Altogether, the album went gold selling over a million copies and helping Cole win two Grammy Awards including Best New Artist and Best Female R&B Vocal Performance, where she broke the winning streak set by Aretha Franklin, who had won the award eight years in a row. (For a time before Cole's win, the award was nicknamed The Aretha Award.) The album's success was the beginning of Cole's mid-1970s successes, as an R&B star releasing five gold albums and two platinum albums during her Capitol tenure.

Track listing

Personnel
Chuck Jackson, Marvin Yancy, Richard Evans - arrangements
Janice Williams - spiritual advisor
Roger Anfinsen, John Janus - engineer, Curtom Studios
Bruce Swedien, Rich Adler - engineer, Universal and Paragon Studios
Roy Kohara - art direction
David Alexander - photography

Charts

Singles

Certifications

See also
List of number-one R&B albums of 1975 (U.S.)

References

External links
 Inseparable at Discogs

1975 debut albums
Natalie Cole albums
Capitol Records albums